Jo van den Hoven (30 October 1911 – 23 November 2001) was a Dutch footballer. He played in one match for the Netherlands national football team in 1937.

References

External links
 

1911 births
2001 deaths
Dutch footballers
Netherlands international footballers
Place of birth missing
Association footballers not categorized by position